Gimme Love may refer to:

 "Gimme Love" (Alexia song), 1998
 "Gimme Love" (Joji song), 2020
 "Gimme Love" (Seyi Shay song), 2018
 Gimmie Love Tour, a 2015 concert tour by Carly Rae Jepsen
 "Gimme Love", a song by Carly Rae Jepsen on her 2015 album Emotion

See also
 "Gimme the Love", a 2016 song by Jake Bugg
 Gimme .... Live, a 1988 live album by The Radiators
 Give Me Love (disambiguation)